Orthosia cypriaca is a species of moth of the family Noctuidae. It is endemic to the Israel, Lebanon, Jordan and Cyprus.

Adults are on wing from January to March. There is one generation per year.

The larvae probably feed on deciduous trees.

External links
 Hadeninae of Israel

Orthosia
Moths of the Middle East
Moths described in 1996